Henry Wilder Keyes (May 23, 1863June 19, 1938) was an American Republican politician from Haverhill, New Hampshire.  He served as the 56th governor of New Hampshire from 1917 to 1919 and as a United States Senator.

Early life
Keyes was born in Newbury, Vermont on May 23, 1863.  He was raised in New Hampshire, and his father was a prominent farmer, merchant, and railroad investor. Keyes graduated from Adams Academy, and then attended Harvard University, from which he graduated in 1887.  He was a farmer and cattle breeder, and initiated raising of the Holstein-Friesian breed in the United States.  He was also a founder of the Woodsville National Bank, and served as its president.

Politics
Keyes served in the New Hampshire House of Representatives from 1891 to 1895.  He served in the New Hampshire State Senate from 1903 to 1905.  He was treasurer of the State license commission from 1903 to 1915, and chairman of the State excise commission from 1915 to 1917.  from 1915 to 1917 he served again in the state House of Representatives.

In 1916 he was elected Governor of New Hampshire, and he served one term, 1917 to 1919.

Keyes ran successfully for the United States Senate in 1918.  He was reelected in 1924 and 1930 and served from March 4, 1919, to January 3, 1937.  he did not run for reelection in 1937. As a senator, he was noted for not speaking on the floor, even nodding or shaking his head to vote "aye" or "nay." The one exception was his motion to adjourn during a long winded speech by Senate Finance Committee Chairman Pat Harrison.

During his Senate career, Keyes served as chairman of: the Committee on Expenditures in the Post Office Department (Sixty-sixth Congress); Committee to Audit and Control the Contingent Expenses (Sixty-eighth and Sixty-ninth Congresses); and Committee on Public Buildings and Grounds (Seventieth through Seventy-second Congresses).

Personal
In 1904, Keyes married Frances Parkinson Wheeler, who as Frances Parkinson Keyes became a prolific author.  He was forty, she was eighteen. They had three sons together—Henry Wilder Keyes, Jr., John Parkinson Keyes, and Francis Keyes.

Keyes died on June 19, 1938 in North Haverhill, New Hampshire, and is buried at the Oxbow Cemetery in Newbury, Vermont.

He was the recipient of an honorary degree of Master of Arts from Dartmouth College and was also as honorary Bachelor of Science and LL.D. of the New Hampshire College of Agriculture and the Mechanic Arts (now the University of New Hampshire).

References

External links

1863 births
1938 deaths
Republican Party governors of New Hampshire
Republican Party members of the New Hampshire House of Representatives
Republican Party New Hampshire state senators
People from Haverhill, New Hampshire
Harvard University alumni
Dartmouth College alumni
People from Newbury, Vermont
Republican Party United States senators from New Hampshire
Burials in Vermont